Natalia Lavrukhina (born 12 November 1987) is a Russian female acrobatic gymnast. With partners Victoria Sukhareva and Natalia Solodinina, Lavrukhina competed in the 2014 Acrobatic Gymnastics World Championships.

References

1987 births
Living people
Russian acrobatic gymnasts
Female acrobatic gymnasts
21st-century Russian women